Randy Johnson (born December 1959) is an American politician who served as a member of the Florida House of Representatives from 1998 to 2006, representing the 41st District, which included portions of Osceola, Lake and Orange counties. During his tenure in the Florida House, Johnson served as Chairman of multiple committees, including Transportation & Economic Development Appropriations, Growth Management, Finance and Tax, The Select Committee on Affordable Housing and The Select Committee on Post-9/11 Economic Development.

Early life and education
Randy Johnson was born in Nampa, Idaho and moved to Central Florida in 1971. Johnson graduated from the University of Florida in 1981 with a Bachelor's Degree in Economics. He later took pursued a master's degree in Applied Economics at the University of Central Florida but did not earn a degree.

Career 
Johnson served as the President and CEO of the Central Florida Sports Commission, a sports-related economic development agency. During his 12-year tenure, the Central Florida Sports Commission grew to be the largest Sports Commission in America. After Johnson's service in the Florida Legislature, he acted as Chief Operating Officer of the Osceola Land Company, managing the operation of a 17,000-acre ranch and the subsequent entitlement process.

Military service
Ensign Johnson received his Wings of Gold as a Naval Aviator in 1986 and spent nine years in the United States Navy, flying over 200 missions aboard the aircraft carriers USS Saratoga (CV-60), USS Theodore Roosevelt (CVN-71) and USS Independence (CV-62). During his service, Johnson was decorated for the rescue of five servicemen, who were lost at sea. Johnson later served as Staff Director and aide to two Navy Admirals at Naval Training Center, Orlando.  During Johnson's tenure, he helped to initiate new standards for the treatment of women in the Navy.

Political career
After leaving the Navy, Randy Johnson served as a Staff Director for the Orange County Board of County Commissioners.

In 1998, Johnson ran for the District 41 seat in the House of Representatives. He was elected in a Conservative Republican sweep that also saw Jeb Bush and Marco Rubio elected. Johnson subsequently won re-election in 2000, 2002 and 2004.

The election to succeed Johnnie Byrd as Speaker of the Florida House of Representatives was unusually competitive, featuring Johnson (R-Celebration), Gaston Cantens (R-Miami) and Allan Bense (R-Panama City) as candidates. Ultimately, Bense was able to collect enough votes to receive the nomination and was voted Speaker.

In 2000, Johnson successfully requested a $250,000 historic preservation grant for Winter Garden's downtown. It was the only municipal grant Gov. Jeb Bush did not veto that year.

In 2001, Johnson passed the Earnhardt Family Protection Act. The bill, named for NASCAR legend Dale Earnhardt, made autopsy photographs, video and audio recordings confidential. Violators could be charged with a third degree felony that could be punishable by jail time and up to a $5,000 fine. Johnson filed the bill after Dale Earnhardt was killed in a crash on the final lap of the 2001 Daytona 500. Earnhardt was the fourth NASCAR driver in less than a year to die in a crash and some news organizations sued to see the photos for stories about racing safety.

In 2002, while Johnson was serving as Chairman of the Transportation and Economic Development Appropriations committee, Johnson successfully proposed a constitutional amendment, ultimately approved overwhelmingly by voters, to counter an unfunded amendment to the Florida's Constitution that mandated the state build a 27-billion-dollar high-speed rail system. In response to this Amendment, Johnson proposed Amendment 2, which would require a financial impact statement to accompany any future constitutional amendment proposed by citizen petition, prior to the public voting on an amendment. The amendment passed overwhelmingly, receiving 78 percent of the vote, making Johnson the only sitting legislator to amend the State Constitution. Johnson's constitutional amendment is credited with preventing passage of several high cost proposals, subsequently saving the state billions of dollars.

In 2004, Johnson served as President of "No Casinos", a statewide coalition opposed to the expansion of gambling in Florida. His group is credited for the subsequent failure of a gaming expansion initiative in Miami-Dade County during the 2005 Legislative Session.

During the 2005 Legislative Session, Randy Johnson led the House effort to pass sweeping new growth management laws. A staunch property rights advocate, Johnson sponsored legislation that provided a method for developers to fairly pay for the impact that new development has on the surrounding community. He also proposed the creation of the Century Commission, a board of statewide community leaders tasked with addressing future development and environmental problems, as well as providing solutions to the Legislature. For his efforts, he was named 2005 Legislator of The Year by the Florida Association of Realtors.

Personal life 
Johnson lives Massachusetts with his wife Nichelle and their son Warren.

Electoral history

See also
Government of Florida
Florida House of Representatives
Republican Party of Florida

External links
Florida House of Representatives
https://www.followthemoney.org/

References

1959 births
Living people
People from Nampa, Idaho
Aviators from Florida
Republican Party members of the Florida House of Representatives
University of Florida alumni
University of Central Florida alumni
United States Naval Aviators
United States Navy officers
20th-century American politicians
21st-century American politicians
American politicians with disabilities